A Woman of Paris is a feature-length American silent film that debuted in 1923. The film, an atypical drama film for its creator, was written, directed, produced and later scored by Charlie Chaplin. It is also known as A Woman of Paris: A Drama of Fate.

Plot
Marie St. Clair and her beau, aspiring artist Jean Millet, plan to leave their small French village for Paris, where they will marry. On the night before their scheduled departure, Marie leaves her house for a rendezvous with Jean. Marie's stepfather locks her out of the house, telling her to find shelter elsewhere.

Jean invites Marie to his parents' home, but his father also refuses to let her stay. Jean escorts Marie to the train station, and promises to return after going home to pack. When he arrives at home, he discovers his father has died. When Jean telephones Marie at the station to tell her they must postpone their trip, she gets on the train without him.

One year later in Paris, Marie enjoys a life of luxury as the mistress of wealthy businessman Pierre Revel. A friend calls and invites Marie to a raucous party in the Latin Quarter. She gives Marie the address but can't remember whether the apartment is in the building on the right or the left. Marie enters the wrong building and is surprised to be greeted by Jean Millet, who shares a modest apartment with his mother. Marie tells Jean she would like for him to paint her portrait and gives him a card with her address.

Jean calls on Marie at her apartment to begin the painting. Marie notices he is wearing a black armband and asks why he is in mourning. Jean tells Marie his father died the night she left without him.

Marie and Jean revive their romance, and Marie distances herself from Pierre Revel. Jean finishes Marie's portrait, but instead of painting her wearing the elegant outfit she chose for the sitting, he paints her in the simple dress she wore on the night she left for Paris.

Jean proposes to Marie. Jean's mother fights with him over the proposal. Marie arrives unexpectedly outside Jean's apartment just in time to overhear Jean pacify his mother, telling her that he proposed in a moment of weakness. Jean fails to convince Marie he did not mean what she overheard, and she returns to Pierre Revel.

The following night, Jean slips a gun into his coat pocket and goes to the exclusive restaurant where Marie and Pierre are dining. Jean and Pierre get into a scuffle, and Jean is ejected from the dining room. Jean fatally shoots himself in the foyer of the restaurant.

The police carry Jean's body to his apartment. Jean's mother retrieves the gun and goes to Marie's apartment, but Marie has gone to Jean's studio. Jean's mother returns and finds Marie sobbing by Jean's body. The two women reconcile and return to the French countryside, where they open a home for orphans in a country cottage.

One morning, Marie and one of the girls in her care walk down the lane to get a pail of milk. Marie and the girl meet a group of sharecroppers who offer them a ride back in their horse-drawn wagon. At the same time, Pierre Revel and another gentleman are riding through the French countryside in a chauffeur-driven automobile. Pierre's companion asks him what had happened to Marie St. Clair. Pierre replies that he does not know. The automobile and the horse-drawn wagon pass each other, heading in opposite directions.

Cast

Production

Two things distinguish this film from Chaplin's other work. The most obvious is that he does not appear in the film, at least not in his traditional role of the Tramp. He has a brief cameo as a porter in a train station. This role is inconspicuous and not credited (he even precedes the film with a title card which explains that he does not appear). Most people seeing the film will not notice that it is actually Chaplin. The other major difference between this and most of Chaplin's other work is that the film is a serious drama.

Edna Purviance plays the lead as Marie St. Clair. One of Chaplin's reasons for producing the film was to help Purviance gain recognition as an actress without Chaplin at her side. Others were because he wanted to stay behind the camera and to make his first real drama. Despite his effort, Purviance did not achieve the level of success that she had in films with Chaplin's Tramp at her side. However, the film did help Adolphe Menjou gain some recognition.

The film was inspired by Chaplin's brief 1922 romance with Peggy Hopkins Joyce, whose stories of her romantic adventures in Europe provided the framework of the screenplay.

The exterior scenes were shot outside the Ansonia Apartments on W. 6th Street and Lake Street, Los Angeles, California.

Chaplin and music associate Eric James created a score for a theatrical reissue. Chaplin elected to trim the film (approximately 8 minutes of footage was removed) for the reissue version to further tighten the action. The Museum of Modern Art held the world premiere of A Woman of Paris with Chaplin’s new music soundtrack on December 23, 1976. The reissue version was given a theatrical release in 1977.

Reception
Upon release A Woman of Paris was not well received. Chaplin was very popular at the time, and many went to the film expecting to see Chaplin in his traditional comedic role. An attempt was made to ease the public into the idea of Chaplin making a movie without starring in it. At the premiere Chaplin had flyers distributed informing those in line that A Woman in Paris diverged from his normal work, and that he hoped the public would find it enjoyable. There is also an opening statement in the film that Chaplin does not appear in it. Some  film historians have speculated that A Woman in Paris might have been received differently if the public had not been forewarned of Chaplin's absence from the cast.

Critical response to the film, on the other hand, was very positive. The film has been credited with influencing later filmmakers. In particular, the motivations and personalities of its characters had a complexity that was unconventional in the context of early 1920s American cinema. Chaplin biographer Jeffrey Vance champions A Woman of Paris and writes at length in Chaplin: Genius of the Cinema of the film's importance. Vance notes,

"Most examinations of A Woman of Paris select a key scene such as Marie on the train platform or Pierre removing a handkerchief from Marie’s dresser drawer, or the natural and simple approach to performance as the basis of the film’s critical laurels, while overlooking Chaplin’s overall construction of the visual narrative.  However, the film’s greatness is not limited to a few isolated scenes. Chaplin’s directorial skill and the film’s power are demonstrated in the careful and direct way that Chaplin tells a simple story. Chaplin achieved his purpose of conveying 'psychology by subtle action' throughout the visual narrative by imbuing the décor with symbolism, by using objects for their metaphoric and metonymic value, and by parallel storytelling and editing." 

It can be considered the first Chaplin feature, since it is the first one made by the company he co-founded, United Artists. Mary Pickford named it a favorite. "Woman of Paris allows us to think for ourselves and does not constantly underestimate our intelligence. It is a gripping human story throughout and the director allows the situations to play themselves. The actors simply react the emotions of the audience." "Charlie Chaplin is the greatest director of the screen," she said on another occasion. "He's a pioneer. How he knows women!—oh, how he knows women! I do not cry easily when seeing a picture, but after seeing Charlie's A Woman of Paris I was all choked up—I wanted to go out in the garden and have it out by myself."

A Woman of Paris, like other films at that time, was subject to censorship by state and local boards. For example, the Pennsylvania State Board of Censors found the film acceptable only with revisions, and, even though Massachusetts passed the film, the local board of Worcester banned the film as being "morally objectionable."

The film's box office failure was painful for Chaplin, and after its initial release it was not seen by the public for over fifty years. Chaplin reissued the edited film with a new musical score—replacing the original score by Louis F. Gottschalk—in 1976, a year before his death. His new composition is credited as the final completed work of his 75-year career.

The movie has a 92% rating on Rotten Tomatoes based on 12 reviews .

References

External links

 
 
 
 
 Lantern slide, lobby card, and stills at silenthollywood.com

1923 films
1923 romantic drama films
American romantic drama films
American silent feature films
American black-and-white films
Films directed by Charlie Chaplin
Films set in Paris
United Artists films
1920s American films
Silent romantic drama films
Silent American drama films